Balancing Act is a 2012 Italian-French drama film directed by Ivano De Matteo. It premiered at the 69th Venice International Film Festival, in which Valerio Mastandrea won the Pasinetti Award.  For his performance Mastandrea was also awarded David di Donatello for Best Actor.

Cast 
Valerio Mastandrea: Giulio
Barbora Bobuľová: Elena
Maurizio Casagrande: Stefano
Rolando Ravello: Franco
Rosabell Laurenti Sellers: Camilla
Grazia Schiavo: Stefania
Antonio Gerardi: Pietro
Antonella Attili

References

External links

2012 films
Italian drama films
Films directed by Ivano De Matteo
2012 drama films
French drama films
2010s French films
2010s Italian films